Field handball (also known as outdoor handball or grass handball) was a form of what is now handball and was played at the 1936 Summer Olympics in Berlin.

The field has two parallel lines  from the goal line, which divides the field into 3 sections; each section can have up to 6 players of each team.

The game is played with the same ball as the indoor type by two teams of 11 players (plus 2 reserves) and two periods of 30 minutes each.

Indoor handball gradually grew in popularity to replace field handball and the last IHF World Men's Outdoor Handball Championship was played in 1966.

See also
Handball at the 1936 Summer Olympics
IHF World Men's Outdoor Handball Championship
IHF World Women's Outdoor Handball Championship

References

External links

Handball at the Olympics
Video 1 about field handball (in German)
Video 2 about field handball (in German)
IHF video
Field Handball rules

Handball variants